The men's triathlon was part of the Triathlon at the 2014 Commonwealth Games program. The competition was held on 24 July 2014 at Strathclyde Country Park in Glasow.

Competition format
The race was held over the "international distance" (also called "Olympic distance") and consisted of  swimming,  road bicycling, and  road running.

Results
A total of 45 athletes participated.

References

Triathlon at the 2014 Commonwealth Games
Commonwealth Games